Daniel "Maxi" Hughes (born 4 March 1990) is a British professional boxer who has held the IBO lightweight title since September 2021 and he had won the WBC International  lightweight title in October 2020. At regional level, he won the British lightweight title in March 2021.

Professional career
Hughes made his professional debut on 17 September 2010, scoring a four-round points decision (PTS) victory against Johnny Greaves at the Doncaster Dome.

After compiling a record of 8–0–1 (0 KOs), he faced Scott Cardle for the vacant Central Area lightweight title on 20 April 2013 at Winter Gardens, Blackpool. In his first championship fight Hughes suffered the first defeat of his career, losing via PTS.

After four victories, Hughes was originally scheduled to face Joseph Laryea for the vacant International Masters super-featherweight title on 12 September 2014 at iceSheffield. After Laryea refused to fight on the scheduled date, he was replaced with Kakhaber Avetisiani. Hughes emerged victorious, winning his first championship via PTS over ten rounds.

He next faced Martin Joseph Ward on 6 December 2014. In a bout that served as an eliminator for the British super-featherweight title, Hughes scored two knockdowns–which Ward claims were the result of an accidental clash of heads and a slip–en route to a majority draw (MD). Two judges scored the bout even at 95–95 and 94–94, while the third judge scored it 95–94 in favour of Ward. The pair had an immediate rematch on 11 April at the First Direct Arena in Leeds, with the vacant WBC International super-featherweight title on the line. In the fifth round Ward landed an uppercut which left Hughes with a "badly damaged nose", prompting his corner to call a halt to the contest at the end of the round, handing Hughes a fifth-round stoppage defeat via corner retirement (RTD).

After three victories in non-title fights, Hughes and Ward–now the British super-featherweight champion–fought for a third time on 25 March 2017 at the Manchester Arena. Hughes suffered the third defeat of his career, losing via twelve-round unanimous decision (UD) with the judges' scorecards reading 118–111, 116–113 and 116–112.

In his next fight he defeated Ryan Moorhead via PTS, capturing the vacant Central Area super-featherweight title on 2 September 2017 at the Doncaster Dome.

Following a technical knockout (TKO) victory against Cassius Connor in November 2017, Hughes made his second attempt at the British championship, facing Sam Bowen for the vacant title on 14 April 2018 at the King Power Stadium in Leicester. Hughes took a knee twice in the seventh round. At the beginning of the eighth, referee Victor Loughlin called a time out to allow the ringside doctor to examine an injury to Hughes' right eye. After the doctor determined Hughes' was unable to continue, Louglin called a halt to the contest, handing Hughes an eighth-round TKO loss.

He bounced back from defeat with a TKO victory against Kieron McLaren in July 2018, before suffering the fifth defeat of his career on 9 November 2019, losing via UD against Liam Walsh in a bout for the vacant WBO European lightweight title at the York Hall in London.

Three fights later he fought undefeated prospect Viktor Kotochigov for the WBC International lightweight title on 9 October 2020 at the Caesars Palace in Dubai. In what media outlets described as an "upset", Hughes scored a knockdown in the third-round en route to a UD victory with the judges' scorecards reading 97–92, 96–93 and 95–94.

In his next fight he faced Paul Hyland Jr for the vacant British lightweight title on 19 March 2021 at the Whites Hotel in Bolton. In what was considered by media outlets as a "controversial" decision, Hughes emerged victorious via eighth-round TKO. Hughes landed a punch to the body of Hyland, causing him to bend over in pain. After referee Mark Lyson initially ordered Hughes to a neutral corner, believing Hyland had touched the floor, Hyland turned his back and walked to the opposite corner. Lyson then corrected his mistake and signalled Hughes to resume the action, at which point, he ran across the ring and landed a right hand on Hyland with his back still turned. Hyland fell to the floor, prompting Lyson to begin a ten count. He made it back to his feet by the count of nine only for Lyson to call a halt to the contest, awarding Hughes the British title in his third attempt.

Following his British title victory, Hughes made his first attempt at a world championship; facing Jovanni Straffon for the lightly-regarded IBO lightweight title on 4 September at the Headingley Rugby Stadium in Leeds. Serving as part of the undercard for Josh Warrington vs. Mauricio Lara, Hughes won a wide UD with two judges scoring the bout 120–117 while the third scored it 119–109.

Professional boxing record

References

External links

Living people
1990 births
English male boxers
Super-featherweight boxers
Lightweight boxers
British Boxing Board of Control champions
International Boxing Organization champions